The Great Synagogue of Stockholm (Bet ha-Knesset ha-Gadol shel Stokholm) is located on a small street called Wahrendorffsgatan, close to the park Kungsträdgården on Norrmalm, Stockholm.  It was built 1867-1870 according to designs made in 1862 by the architect Fredrik Wilhelm Scholander. The building has been called a "paraphrase over Oriental motifs" (Nordisk familjebok 26, col. 1470 ), and it is listed in the Swedish registry of national historical buildings.  It was preceded by an earlier synagogue at Tyska Brunnsplan in the Stockholm Old Town (now the Jewish Museum on 19, Själagårdsgatan), used 1790-1870, and services were held in an even earlier location on Köpmanbrinken near Köpmantorget in the Old town 1787-1790.

The Judiska biblioteket, the Jewish Community Library, is located beneath the Great Synagogue of Stockholm.  Its multilingual collection consists of books in Swedish, German, English, French, Hebrew, and other languages.  It includes the library of Rabbi Marcus Ehrenpreis (1869–1951), who was Chief Rabbi of Sweden from 1914 to 1951.  The Library also hosts occasional exhibits, such as the 2007 exhibit of the Friedrich Kellner World War II diary which chronicles the years of Nazi Germany and the Holocaust of European Jewry.

A monument to the memory of victims of the Holocaust, with more than 8,000 names of victims who were relatives of Swedish Jews, was dedicated by the King of Sweden, Carl XVI Gustav, at the synagogue in 1998.

In 2017 a new mikvah was built in the basement of the synagogue.

Hebrew inscriptions

Decorative inscriptions in Hebrew are etched and painted into the stonework of the Great Synagogue. On the front facade is written, ועשו לי מקדש ושכנתי בתוכם, from Exodus 25:8-9, "And make Me a sanctuary that I may dwell among them."

On the rear facade are two inscriptions; בית הכנסת הגדול של שטוקהולם, the building's formal name ("The Great Synagogue of Stockholm"), under which is written Isaiah 57:19, בורא ניב שפתים שלום שלום לרחוק ולקרוב אמר יי ורפאתיו, "Peace, peace, to him that is far off and to him that is near, saith the LORD that createth the fruit of the lips; and I will heal him."

References

 Nordisk familjebok, s.v. "Synagoga"
 Nordisk familjebok, s.v. "Stockholm"

External links
 The Great Synagogue of Stockholm from Museum of the Jewish People at Beit Hatfutsot

Ashkenazi Jewish culture in Sweden
Ashkenazi synagogues
Conservative Judaism in Europe
Synagogue
Conservative synagogues
Jews and Judaism in Stockholm
Synagogues in Sweden
1870 establishments in Sweden
Synagogues completed in 1870
Moorish Revival synagogues